Demetre C. Daskalakis (born 1972/1973) is an American physician and gay health activist serving as director of the Division of HIV/AIDS Prevention in the National Center for HIV/AIDS, Viral Hepatitis, STD, and TB Prevention since 2020. In 2022, the administration of Joe Biden appointed him the White House National Monkeypox Response Deputy Coordinator.

Early life and education 
Daskalakis was born in Washington, D.C. to Greek parents and raised in Arlington, Virginia. He studied at Columbia University, where he earned a bachelor's degree in biology in 1995. He recalls becoming interested in AIDS during his senior year at Columbia University, when he was given the task to fly the AIDS Memorial Quilt as part of a student campaign to raise awareness of AIDS. He then received his medical degree from the NYU School of Medicine and completed post-graduate medical training at Harvard Medical School in 2003. In 2012, he earned a Master of Public Health from the Harvard T.H. Chan School of Public Health.

Career 
Daskalakis worked at Mount Sinai Hospital in Brooklyn, where at one time he held the position of medical director of ambulatory HIV services. He was also an assistant professor at New York University. His work with the "Men's Sexual Health Project", which he founded in 2006, involved working in sex clubs and bathhouses to test men for sexually transmitted diseases including HIV and direct them to care. Daskalakis joined the New York City Department of Health in 2013. During a 2012-2013 meningitis outbreak in the city, Daskalakis opened a pop-up clinic as part of a vaccination campaign targeting at-risk groups, such as men who had sex with men, and was credited with halting it. By 2014, he was deputy commissioner for the Division of Disease Control at the New York City Department of Health and Mental Hygiene.

Daskalakis was a task force member of Ending the Epidemic, a campaign focused on decreasing HIV transmission rates in New York City. Since joining the city's health department, he has promoted the concept of "status-neutral care", a strategy for HIV treatment and prevention which takes the same approach to initial patient care regardless of the patient's HIV status. The concept was part of the plan for the Ending the Epidemic campaign.

Starting on December 21, 2020, he has served as the Centers for Disease Control and Prevention's Director of the Division of HIV/AIDS Prevention in the National Center for HIV/AIDS, Viral Hepatitis, STD, and TB Prevention. On August 2, 2022, President Joe Biden appointed him as the White House National Monkeypox Response Deputy Coordinator. Following his appointment, right-wing figures and media have falsely accused Daskalakis of being a Satanist due to his clothing and tattoos, including a pentagram tattoo, which he has explicitly denied.

Personal life 
Daskalakis is gay. He met his husband Michael Macneal at Macneal's gym, Monster Cycle.

Daskalakis attended a Greek Orthodox church in Washington, D.C. growing up. He has explained that the large tattoo of Jesus on his stomach is inspired by the church.

References 

Living people
Date of birth missing (living people)
Year of birth missing (living people)
21st-century American LGBT people
21st-century American physicians
Physicians from Washington, D.C.
Activists from Washington, D.C.
LGBT people from Virginia
LGBT people from Washington, D.C.
People from Arlington County, Virginia
American medical researchers
Biden administration personnel
Columbia College (New York) alumni
New York University Grossman School of Medicine alumni
New York University faculty
Gay academics
Gay scientists
Harvard Medical School alumni
Harvard School of Public Health alumni
HIV/AIDS researchers
LGBT physicians